The blue-fronted redstart (Phoenicurus frontalis) is a species of bird in the family Muscicapidae, the Old World flycatchers. It breeds in central China and the Himalayas (where it winters in the southern foothills, as well as in Yunnan, Northeast India and northern Southeast Asia). Its natural habitat is temperate forests.  The female is brownish-grey, with paler underparts.

Gallery

References

blue-fronted redstart
Birds of the Himalayas
Birds of Tibet
Birds of Central China
blue-fronted redstart
Taxonomy articles created by Polbot